VietNam is a rock band from Brooklyn, New York on Mexican Summer. Since the group's inception it has undergone many personnel changes, with leader Michael Gerner remaining the sole original member and chief songwriter. VietNam released their first EP on Vice Records in 2004, The Concrete's Always Grayer on the Other Side of the Street followed by VietNam in 2007 and an A.merican D.ream in 2013.

Discography 
The Concrete's Always Grayer on the Other Side of the Street (2004)
VietNam (2007)
an A.merican D.ream (2013)

External links
Official Band Site
Comprehensive feature in which Vietnam tells their entire story to New York Night Train
5 live videos of VietNam on scheduletwo.com
Jonathan Toubin article for Gibson Guitars

Mexican Summer artists
Musical groups established in 2004
Musical groups from Brooklyn